Bouk Schellingerhoudt (4 May 1919 – 19 September 2010) was a Dutch racing cyclist. He rode in the 1947 Tour de France.

References

External links
 

1919 births
2010 deaths
Dutch male cyclists
Sportspeople from Zaanstad
Cyclists from North Holland